Za Jeziorem  ("behind the lake") is a former settlement in the administrative district of Gmina Tuchola, within Tuchola County, Kuyavian-Pomeranian Voivodeship, in north-central Poland.

References

Za Jeziorem